Oneida may refer to:

Native American/First Nations 
 Oneida people, a Native American/First Nations people and one of the five founding nations of the Iroquois Confederacy
 Oneida language
 Oneida Indian Nation, based in New York
 Oneida Nation of the Thames, also known as "Onyota'a:ka First Nation"
 Oneida Nation of Wisconsin

Places 
 Oneida County (disambiguation)
 Oneida Township (disambiguation)

Canada
 Oneida 41, Ontario, also known as the "Oneida Settlement"
 Oneida Township, Ontario, a historic township of Haldimand County

United States
 Oneida, former name of Martell, California
 Oneida, Illinois
 Oneida, Kansas
 Oneida, Kentucky
 Oneida, New York
 Oneida, Ohio
 Oneida, Pennsylvania
 Oneida Falls, one of 24 named waterfalls in Ricketts Glen State Park in Pennsylvania
 Oneida, Tennessee
 Oneida (town), Wisconsin in Outagamie County
 Oneida, Wisconsin, unincorporated community in both Outagamie and Brown Counties
 Oneida Castle, New York, a village
 Oneida Corners, New York, hamlet of the town of Queensbury in Warren County
 Oneida, a former name of Amarillo, Texas
 Oneida Creek, in central New York State
 Oneida Lake, in central New York State
 Oneida River, in central New York State
 Oneida County Airport, a closed airport in Whitestown, New York

Sport 
 Oneida Football Club, historical Boston football club (founded in 1862)
 Oneida FC, a Cambridge, Massachusetts rugby league club

Other uses 
 Oneida Carry, a portage for native and colonial Americans in Central New York
 Oneida Limited, the international tableware company
 Oneida Community, a religious intentional community in Oneida, New York
 Oneida (band), a five-piece rock band from Brooklyn, New York
 Oneida (moth), a genus of moths
 USS Oneida, any of five ships in the U.S. Navy
 Two civilian steam yachts owned by Elias Cornelius Benedict, each associated with unique historical incidents:
 USS Adelante (SP-765), originally launched in 1883 as the Utowana, acquired and renamed Oneida by Benedict in 1887 and later renamed again as the Adelante before being acquired by the U.S. Navy in 1918; notable as the site of a secret operation in July 1893 on President Grover Cleveland for the removal of a cancerous growth from his mouth.
 Oneida (1897), originally launched in 1897 as the Alcedo before being renamed and acquired by Benedict as a larger replacement for the previous ship of that name owned by him, considered for acquisition by the U.S. Navy during World War I but never taken, and later acquired by William Randolph Hearst (with whom it became involved with the mysterious death of film producer Thomas H. Ince).
 Whitestown Seminary, a Presbyterian educational institution based in Whitestown, New York, and founded in 1827, previously known as Oneida Academy and Oneida Institute

Language and nationality disambiguation pages